Trash Day may refer to:

 "Trash Day" (2 Stupid Dogs), a 1993 episode of 2 Stupid Dogs
 "Trash Day", a 1997 episode of Dr. Katz, Professional Therapist
 "Trash Day", the English title of a 2000 episode of Digimon Adventure
 "Trash Day", a 2003 song by "Weird Al" Yankovic from his album Poodle Hat

See also
 Garbage Day (disambiguation)
 "Take out the Trash Day", a 2000 episode of the television show The West Wing